The 1997 European Junior Badminton Championships were the 15th tournament of the European Junior Badminton Championships. It was held in Nymburk, Czech Republic, from 30 March to 5 April 1997. Dutch players won both the singles events; while Danish players dominated all three doubles disciplines. Denmark also won the mixed team title.

Medalists

Results

Semi-finals

Finals

Medal table

References 

European Junior Badminton Championships
European Junior Badminton Championships
European Junior Badminton Championships
European Junior Badminton Championships
International sports competitions hosted by the Czech Republic